Cold Cold Hearts is the 1997 debut solo album by the American riot grrrl band Cold Cold Hearts. It is a follow-up to their 7" single, "Yer So Sweet (Baby Donut)" and the band's only full-length studio album.

Track listing
 VxRx – 1:41
 Any Resemblance... – 2:04
 5 Signs: Scorpio – 1:44
 Cute Boy Discount – 3:17
 Broken Teeth – 2:06
 Lady! Reversible! (Alleged.) – 1:41
 Maybe Scabies – 1:44
 1-2-3 Many! – 1:45
 Sorry Yer Band Sux ("Rebels Without a Brains") – 2:10
 Yer So Sweet (Baby Donut) – 1:26
 State Trooper in the Left Lane, Nattles! – 2:16

Critical reception 
Remarking on the relative enduring freshness of the songs, AllMusic called the album "a solid entry into the contemporary tradition of post-riot grrrl Northwestern rock".

"Any Resemblance... " was included in a "Riot Grrrl Essential Listening Guide" compiled by Evelyn McDonnell and Elisabeth Vincentelli for The New York Times.

Credits
 Erin Smith - Guitar, Vocals (Background), Photography 
 Allison Wolfe - Vocals
 Natalie Mencinsky (Credited as "Nattles") - Bass, Artwork (Design)
 Katherine Brown - Drums
 Mark Robinson - Vocals (Background), Producer, Engineer, Art Direction
 Matt Lettsinger - Engineer
 Rob Christiansen - Engineer

References 

1997 albums
Kill Rock Stars albums
Cold Cold Hearts albums